Jason Guriel is a Canadian poet and critic.

Works

Poetry

Criticism

Awards
 2007 Frederick Bock Prize
 2009 Editors Prize For Book Reviewing, poetry

References

External links
Going Negative Poetry Foundation essay by Jason Guriel
The World Stands Still and Still We Flow Poetry Foundation essay by Jason Guriel
Tuckerman's Return The New Criterion essay by Jason Guriel

Living people
21st-century Canadian poets
Writers from Ontario
Canadian male poets
21st-century Canadian male writers
Year of birth missing (living people)